The LCM62 is a mechanized landing craft used by the Marina Militare.

History 

First four hull was bought by Italian Ministry of Defense (NAVARM) on 21 December 2007, for €3.992.000,00.
The fifth hull was bought by Italian Ministry of Defense (NAVARM) on 9 November 2009.
The last four hull was bought by Italian Ministry of Defense (NAVARM) on 21 December 2010.

LCM62 class is named by Vittoria Shipyards as C828 class and is a vehicle crafted to support amphibious military action.
This boat has been designed for the transport of troops and ground vehicles, as part of landing operations on the coasts.
These models are required and employed by all major navy forces, for their versatility and safety features guaranteed by the ballistic protection of the cabin.
The hull and superstructure construction material is steel AH36.
The closed and air-conditioned wheelhouse can accommodate up to three sailors. The wheelhouse and the front ramp door are equipped with ballistic protection against NATO 7.62×51mm A.P. bullets.

The M.T.M. (Motozattera Trasporto Mezzi) class landing crafts LCM62 have been developed by Studio Fast Service and Vittoria Shipyard for the Marina Militare.
Nine of these crafts are on board the three San Marco class LPD ships and are used by Brigata Marina San Marco to Brindisi Naval Station homeport.

Algerian Navy 

In July 2011 the Algerian Navy placed an order with Fincantieri for an improved version of the San Giorgio class amphibious transport ships classified as Bâtiment de Débarquement et de Soutien Logistique (BDSL), named Kalaat Béni-Abbès.
The BDSL can accommodate three Landing Craft Mechanized type C.828, built in Ecrn (Etablissement de Construction et Réparation Navales) Shipyard of Mers-El-Kebir (Algeria), under license by Cantieri Vittoria

Landing craft

References

External links 
 Ships Marina Militare website

Amphibious warfare vessel classes
Ships built in Italy
Landing craft
Amphibious warfare vessels of the Italian Navy